The  is a railway line in Japan operated by East Japan Railway Company (JR East). It links Kobuchizawa Station in Hokuto, Yamanashi with Komoro Station in Komoro, Nagano, and extends 78.9 km (49.0 mi) through the mountains with a total of 31 stations. It roughly follows the route of National Route 141, paralleling the road at some places and crossing it twice.

Stations
All local trains stop at all stations. Extra rapid trains stop at specific stations.

Some of the stations along the Koumi Line are among the highest in Japan, with Nobeyama Station reaching 1,345 meters above sea level. Because of the frequent stops and winding route, the full 78.9-kilometer journey often takes as long as two and a half hours to traverse. However, the journey is known for its scenery, in which passengers can see nature, highlands, high mountains and one of the most beautiful starlit skies at night.

Local trains run between Koumi or Nakagomi and Komoro, between Kobuchizawa and Nobeyama or Komi respectively, excluding local trains running the full length of the line. In 2022, JR East announced the names of railway lines which were failing to make a profit, which included the section of this line between Koumi and Kobuchizawa.

Local trains are driver-only operated (one-person operation) between Nakagomi and Kobuchizawa. However, lots of passengers use the stations between Nakagomi and Komoro, so local trains in this section have conductors onboard. 

Nakagomi Station is located near the Koumi Line Operation Office, where many train staff are working.
 

Legend
 ◇・∨・∧ - passing loop
 ｜ - no passing loop

Rolling stock
 KiHa 110 series DMUs, since November 1991
 KiHa E200 hybrid DMUs, since July 2007

Special liveries
In February 2015, to mark the 80th anniversary of the opening of the Koumi Line, a single-car KiHa 110 series unit was repainted into the "Metropolitan" all-over red livery carried by KiHa 52 DMUs formerly used on the line. This was followed in March 2015 by a two-car KiHa 110 series unit repainted into the vermillion and cream livery carried by KiHa 58 series DMUs formerly used on the line.

History

The Saku Railway opened the section from Komoro to Haguroshita in 1915, and extended the line to Koumi in 1919. The company planned a railway network extending from Kōfu in the south to Naoetsu and Nagaoka in the north, linking up with the Fuji Minobe Railway to create a coast-to-coast rail line. North of Komoro, Saku Railway obtained a construction permit for a section between Yashiro and Suzaka, but this was transferred to the local Katō Railway (predecessor of the Nagano Electric Railway). Due to World War I construction of the line south of Koumi was not undertaken. Diesel railcars were introduced on the line in 1930.

The Koumi - Saku-Uminokuchi section was opened in 1932 by Japanese National Railways (JNR), which also opened the Kobuchizawa — Kiyosato section in 1933. The Saku Railway was nationalised in 1934, and the Saku-Uminokuchi - Kiyosato section opened in 1935, completing the line.

In July 2017, JR East launched the tourist train High Rail 1375.  "1375" refers to the elevation of 1,375 m of the highest point on any JR line in Japan. The train makes the most of its backdrop, and offers unique services for day and night operations.

Timeline
 November 29, 1935: Nobeyama Station opens.
 March 1, 1944: Kubo Station renamed Kita-Nakagomi Station. Namezu Station closed.
 November 11, 1944: Operations stopped at Managashi, Irizawa, Ōnara, and Otome stations.
 March 1, 1952: Second Namezu Station opens. Operations resume at Managashi, Aonuma (formerly Irizawa), Tatsuokajō (formerly Ōnara), Otome stations.
 May 1, 1952: Ōtabe Station opens.
 July 10, 1952: Higashi-Komoro Station opens.
 October 1, 1959: Sakuhozumi Station renamed Yachiho Station.
 October 1, 1963: Sandanda Station renamed Usuda Station.
 February 1, 1984: Freight operations end.
 July 26, 1986: Photo Deck Station opens.
 September 1, 1986: Photo Deck Station closes.
 April 1, 1987: With the privatization and breakup of JNR, line becomes part of East Japan Railway Company (JR East).
 December 1, 1988: Misato Station opens.
 November 8, 1991: KiHa 110 series DMUs begin operation.
 March 14, 1992: Driver-only operation begins.
 October 12, 1995: Iwamurada — Nakasato section elevated.
 October 1, 1997: Sakudaira Station opens.
 July 31, 2007: KiHa E200 series hybrid DMUs begin operation.

See also
List of railway lines in Japan

References

 
Lines of East Japan Railway Company
Rail transport in Yamanashi Prefecture
Railway lines in Nagano Prefecture
1067 mm gauge railways in Japan
Railway lines opened in 1919